Ernesto Porto (16 August 1928 – 5 February 1973) was a Filipino boxer. He competed at the 1948 Summer Olympics and the 1952 Summer Olympics. At the 1948 Summer Olympics, he lost in his first fight to Gerald Dreyer of South Africa, the eventual gold medalist. He also won the gold medal in the lightweight division of the 1954 Asian Games.

References

External links
 

1928 births
1973 deaths
Sportspeople from Quezon City
Filipino male boxers
Olympic boxers of the Philippines
Boxers at the 1948 Summer Olympics
Boxers at the 1952 Summer Olympics
Asian Games gold medalists for the Philippines
Boxers at the 1954 Asian Games
Medalists at the 1954 Asian Games
Asian Games medalists in boxing
Light-welterweight boxers